Angers is a surname. Notable people with the surname include:

 Auguste-Réal Angers (1837–1919), Canadian judge
 Avril Angers (1918–2005), English actress
 François M. Angers (21st century), Canadian judge
 François-Albert Angers (1909–2003), Canadian economist
 François-Réal Angers (1812–1860), Canadian lawyer
 Louis Charles Alphonse Angers (1854–1929), Canadian politician
 Michel Angers (born 1959), Canadian politician

See also
 Albinus of Angers (c. 470 – 550), French abbot and bishop